Send in the Clowns is an album by jazz singer Sarah Vaughan that was released by Mainstream Records in 1974.

Track listing 
 "Send in the Clowns" (Stephen Sondheim) – 3:27
 "Love Don't Live Here Anymore" (Rose Marie McCoy, Ginny Redington) – 3:04
 "That'll Be Johnny" (Helen Miller, Rose Marie McCoy) – 2:43
 "Right in the Next Room" (Helen Miller, Rose Marie McCoy) – 2:59
 "I Need You More (Than Ever Now)" (Helen Miller, Rose Marie McCoy) – 2:53
 "On Thinking It Over" (Brian Auger, Jim Mullen) –3:26
 "Do Away with April" (Helen Miller, Howard Greenfield) – 3:30
 "Wave" (Antônio Carlos Jobim) – 3:26
 "Got to Go See If I Can't Get Daddy to Come Back Home" (Helen Miller, Rose Marie McCoy) – 2:58
 "Fraiser (The Sensuous Lion)" (Johnny Mercer, Jimmy Rowles) – 4:15

Personnel
 Vocals by Sarah Vaughan
 Arranged and conducted by Paul Griffiths (1), Gene Page (2-5, 7, 9), Ernie Wilkins (6), Michel Legrand (8), and Wade Marcus (10)
 Produced by Bob Shad
 Recorded in New York City and Los Angeles, 1973-74

References

1974 albums
Sarah Vaughan albums
albums produced by Bob Shad
Mainstream Records albums